Gandhi Institute of Advanced Computer & Research, Rayagada (GIACR), formerly IACR, is an engineering college located in Rayagada, in the state of Odisha, India. It was established in 1999 by Rabindranath Educational Trust, Rayagada with the approval of AICTE, New Delhi and Government of Odisha and affiliated to Biju Patnaik University of Technology. GIACR is certified with ISO 9001:2008 by Bureau Veritas for the Quality Management System.

Academics
Initially (postgraduate) M.C.A. course was introduced and MBA was introduced in 2006. Since 2004, GIACR offers 06 undergraduate B.Tech courses in CSE, IT, ECE, EEE, Civil Engineering and Mechanical Engineering. Admission is through the Odisha Joint Entrance Examination (OJEE). It also offers Diploma courses in Civil Engineering & Mechanical Engineering.

Facilities
GIACR facilities include a beautiful garden, Central Library, Air Conditioned Computer Laboratories, Computer Center, Training, Development & Placement Divn., Mechanical Workshops, Civil Workshops, Electrical Laboratories, Electronics Laboratories, Canteen & Students Common Room.

References

External links
Official website of the Gandhi Institute of Advanced Computer & Research

Engineering colleges in Odisha
Colleges affiliated with Biju Patnaik University of Technology
All India Council for Technical Education
Education in Rayagada district
Educational institutions established in 1999
1999 establishments in Orissa